Tahsin Bekir Balta (1902–1970) was a Turkish politician and member of the European Commission of Human Rights from 1963 to 1969.

References

1902 births
1970 deaths
20th-century Turkish politicians
Members of the European Commission of Human Rights
Turkish judges of international courts and tribunals